Bryant Township is a township in Graham County, Kansas, United States.

Demographics 
As of the 2020 census, its population was 80.

Geography
According to the USGS, it contains two cemeteries: Leland and Saint Anthony.

References

External links
 City-Data.com

Townships in Graham County, Kansas
Townships in Kansas